Luis Jesús Martínez Encabo (born April 15, 1976 in Logroño, La Rioja) is a Spanish sport shooter. Martinez represented Spain at the 2008 Summer Olympics in Beijing, where he competed only in two rifle shooting events. He scored a total of 589 points in the men's 10 m air rifle by two points behind Slovenia's Rajmond Debevec from the fifth attempt, finishing only in thirty-second place. Few days later, Martinez placed fiftieth in his second event, 50 m rifle prone, by one point ahead of Oman's Dadallah Al-Bulushi from the final attempt, with a total score of 582 targets.

References

External links
NBC 2008 Olympics profile

Spanish male sport shooters
Living people
Olympic shooters of Spain
Shooters at the 2008 Summer Olympics
Sportspeople from Logroño
1976 births